Empire Lifeguard (K443) was a  convoy rescue ship of the Second World War. Initially built as HMS Maiden Castle -  one of 44  built for the Royal Navy - she was completed in 1944 as a convoy rescue ship to pick up survivors from attacks ont he convoys. Operated for the Ministry of War Transport (MoWT) she served in this role with convoys during the war. Post war she was operated as a transport in the Mediterranean. She was damaged by a terrorist attack and sunk in 1947 but repaired and ultimately sold for scrap in 1955.

Design and description
The Castle-class corvette was a stretched version of the preceding Flower class, enlarged to improve seakeeping and to accommodate modern weapons. They were powered by a pair of triple-expansion steam engines, each driving one propeller shaft using steam provided by two Admiralty three-drum boilers. The ships' complement was 99 officers and ratings.

The Castle-class ships were equipped with a single QF  Mk XVI gun forward, but their primary weapon was their single three-barrel Squid anti-submarine mortar. This was backed up by one depth charge rail and two throwers for 15 depth charges. The ships were fitted with two twin and a pair of single mounts for  Oerlikon light AA guns. Provision was made for a further four single mounts if needed. They were equipped with Type 145Q and Type 147B ASDIC sets to detect submarines by reflections from sound waves beamed into the water. A Type 277 search radar and a HF/DF radio direction finder rounded out the Castles' sensor suite.

Construction and career
Maiden Castle was laid down by Fleming and Ferguson at their shipyard at Paisley, Scotland, in 1943 and launched on 8 June 1944. She was completed in November and served as a convoy escort until the end of the Second World War in May 1945. The ship was placed in reserve on 25 May. Maiden Castle was reactivated in November and assigned to the Fishery Protection Flotilla based at Fleetwood. In 1947 she returned to reserve. The ship was sold and arrived at Sunderland on 22 December 1955 to be broken up.

October 1945 reactivated to pick up the RN Shore Party at Murmansk and bring them back to the Clyde. She then sailed to Kiel and took another Naval party to Devonport.

Post war she served in Home fleet and the Mediterranean as an Army Transport, including the transport of Jewish refugees to Palestine.

23 July 1947, She was sunk in Haifa harbour near Haganah with a bomb while discharging 300 Jewish immigrants who had officially been admitted to Palestine under quota. Sixty-five immigrants were killed and 40 were wounded. She was later raised and scrapped on 22 June 1955.

See also
SS Empire Comfort
SS Empire Peacemaker .
SS Empire Rest 
SS Empire Shelter

References 

 
 
 
 
 
"Scottish Built Ships"
 

Castle-class corvettes
1944 ships
Ships built on the River Clyde